The Topper was a long running anthology comic which ran from 1953 to 1990. Mergers with two other comics, Buzz and Sparky in 1975 and 1977, respectively, added characters from those comics to The Topper's roster. The Topper eventually merged with another comic The Beezer in 1990 becoming the Beezer and Topper, this new comic featured a number of characters from The Topper and ended in 1993 with a few of the characters going on to appear in two other comics The Beano and The Dandy. The comic included a number of comic strip adaptations of classic novels, mainly the works of H. Rider Haggard and Robert Louis Stevenson.

See also
List of Beano comic strips
List of Beano comic strips by annual
List of Dandy comic strips
List of Beezer comic strips
List of Beezer and Topper comic strips

References

Comics anthologies
British comics
Beezer and Topper